Akiyoshi (written:  or ) is a Japanese surname. Notable people with the surname include:

, Japanese motorcycle racer
, Japanese actress
, Japanese baseball player
, Japanese golfer
, Japanese footballer
, Japanese American musician
, Japanese ten-pin bowler

Notable people with the name include:

, Japanese kugyō
, Japanese baseball player
, Japanese warlord
, Japanese psychologist
, Japanese cross-country skier
, Japanese actor
, Japanese golfer
, Japanese ice hockey player
, Japanese film director
, Japanese mass murderer
, Japanese politician and samurai
, Japanese footballer

Japanese-language surnames
Japanese masculine given names